Kumtorkalinsky District (Xumtorqali yaq) is an administrative and municipal district (raion), one of the forty-one in the Republic of Dagestan, Russia. It is located in the east of the republic. Its administrative center is the rural locality (a selo) of Korkmaskala. As of the 2010 Census, the total population of the district was 24,848, with the population of Korkmaskala accounting for 31.1% of that number.

Administrative and municipal status
Within the framework of administrative divisions, Kumtorkalinsky District is one of the forty-one in the Republic of Dagestan. It is divided into one settlement (an administrative division with the administrative center in the urban-type settlement (an inhabited locality) of Tyube) and one selsoviet, which comprise seven rural localities. As a municipal division, the district is incorporated as Kumtorkalinsky Municipal District. The settlement is incorporated as an urban settlement, and the selsoviet is incorporated as six rural settlements within the municipal district. The selo of Korkmaskala serves as the administrative center of both the administrative and municipal district.

References

Notes

Sources

Districts of Dagestan
